Justice Institute of British Columbia (JIBC) is a public, post-secondary educational institution in New Westminster, British Columbia, Canada, that is focused on training professionals in the justice, public safety and social services fields. JIBC also has campuses in  Victoria, Kelowna, Chilliwack, Pitt Meadows, and Maple Ridge.

Programs
JIBC offers degrees, diplomas and applied certificates, as well as on-site professional workshops and training, through its 11 divisions:

 School of Public Safety
 Emergency Management Division
 Fire & Safety Division
 Driver Education Centre
 School of Criminal Justice & Security
 Police Academy
 Sheriff Academy
 Corrections & Court Services Division
 Justice & Public Safety Division
 School of Health, Community & Social Justice
 Centre for Conflict Resolution
 Centre for Counselling & Community Safety
 Centre for Leadership
 Health Sciences Division

The Police Academy is where all municipal police officers in British Columbia receive their basic training, as well as special constables, municipal reserve and BC Royal Canadian Mounted Police (RCMP) Auxiliary Constable. The Academy also offers advanced police training courses, and training for security and gaming officers.

Paramedics, firefighters, sheriffs, corrections officers, probation officers, peace officers, family justice counsellors, mediators, law enforcement, Bylaw Enforcement Officers, emergency management and security professionals, Emergency Social Services volunteers and search and rescue volunteers  are also trained by the JIBC. It also offers programs in leadership, conflict resolution and emergency management. Hong Kong Fire Services also used JIBC for additional advanced training for their EMS personnel.

JIBC currently offers two four-year degrees:
 Bachelor of Public Safety Administration
 Bachelor of Emergency and Security Management Studies (online)

The Institute collaborates with the Singapore University of Social Sciences (SUSS) on SUSS's Minor in Paramedicine and Emergency Response.

Awards and scholarships

JIBC students can apply for a number of student awards, scholarships, and bursaries. In addition to a general student bursary, students can apply for various external awards and other forms of financial aid.

Arms

See also
List of institutes and colleges in British Columbia
List of universities in British Columbia
Education in Canada
Higher education in British Columbia

References

External links
Justice Institute of British Columbia
BCcampus - Justice Institute of British Columbia Data
Justice Institute takes on green energy

Education in New Westminster
Law enforcement in Canada
Universities and colleges in Greater Vancouver
Educational institutions established in 1978
1978 establishments in British Columbia